The 2019 Teen Choice Awards ceremony was held on August 11, 2019, and used a temporary outdoor on-beach stage in Hermosa Beach, California near the beach pier. This was the only time the ceremony was held outdoors. The awards celebrated the year's achievements in music, film, television, sports, fashion, comedy, and the internet, and were voted on by viewers aged 13 and over living in the United States on their website and through various social media sites.

Leading the way with the most nominations was Avengers: Endgame with nine. Taylor Swift was the recipient of the inaugural "Icon" award.

Performers

Bazzi and HRVY were originally going to perform at the ceremony, but they were pulled out at the last minute.

Winners and nominees
The first wave of nominations were announced on June 19, 2019. The second wave was announced on July 8, 2019. Winners are listed first, in bold.

Movies

Television

Music

Digital

Miscellaneous

References

2019
2019 awards in the United States
2019 in Los Angeles
August 2019 events in the United States
2019 film awards
2019 television awards
2019 music awards